The Bosut-Basarabi complex is a common name for two related prehistoric Iron Age cultures in Southeastern Europe:

 The Bosut culture
 The Basarabi culture

References 

Archaeological cultures of Southeastern Europe
Iron Age cultures of Europe